The 1990–91 Cymru Alliance was the first season of the Cymru Alliance following its establishment earlier in 1990. The league was won by Flint Town United.

League table

External links
Cymru Alliance

Cymru Alliance seasons
2
Wales